Prince Nicholas Engalitcheff (ru: Николай Енгалычев, 1874–1935) was a member of Russian nobility and later the Imperial Russian Vice Consul to Chicago during the early 1900s.

Biography
He married Evelyn Pardridge Clayton, the daughter of Charles Pardridge, on October 1898. They had a son, Vladimir N. Engalitcheff (1902–1923). They lived in a home on 526 W. Deming in Chicago. They divorced in 1916. He married Mélanie de Bertrand-Lyteuil in 1916. By 1921 he was in debt owing over $2,400. He divorced in 1933 and married Susanna Bransford Emery Holmes Delitch. He died in 1935.

References

1874 births
1935 deaths
Expatriates from the Russian Empire in the United States